The Chandler Falls Formation is a geologic formation in Michigan. It preserves fossils dating back to the Ordovician period.

References
 

Ordovician Michigan
Ordovician southern paleotropical deposits